Brett Stewart Sterling (born April 24, 1984) is an American former professional ice hockey left winger who played in the National Hockey League (NHL) with the Atlanta Thrashers, Pittsburgh Penguins and the St. Louis Blues.

Sterling was selected by the Thrashers in the 5th round (145th overall) of the 2003 NHL Entry Draft. In his first professional season he won the Willie Marshall Award as the AHL's leading goal scorer, the Dudley "Red" Garrett Memorial Award as rookie of the year. In addition, he was named to the All-Rookie Team and AHL First All-Star Team.

Early life
Sterling, who is Jewish, was born in Los Angeles, California. He grew up in Pasadena, California, having been introduced to the sport by an uncle who bought Sterling his first pair of skates at age two. He played in the 1998 Quebec International Pee-Wee Hockey Tournament with the Los Angeles Junior Kings minor ice hockey team. His GPA in high school was 4.2.

Playing career
Sterling's four-year college career was spent with Colorado College, where he played with future Atlanta Thrashers teammate Colin Stuart. He accumulated 108 goals and 184 points in 150 games played over his college career and was drafted in the fifth round, 145th overall, by the Atlanta Thrashers in the 2003 NHL Entry Draft. Sterling scored 28 points in 30 games as a sophomore for Colorado College. He finished third in scoring for the Tigers, missing the first part of the season due to an injury. Sterling's best collegiate season came in 2004–05, when he had 34 goals, 29 assists and 63 points. That year, he was a top 3 finalist for the Hobey Baker Award, given annually to college hockey's top player. The following year, in his senior season, he was a top 10 finalist.

Sterling garnered many accolades in his first season of pro hockey. Playing with the Chicago Wolves, the Thrashers' American Hockey League affiliate, he amassed 55 goals and 97 points in 77 games. He also added 12 points in 15 playoff games. He won the Willie Marshall Award as the league's leading goal scorer, and also won the Dudley "Red" Garret Memorial Trophy as rookie of the year. In addition, he was also named to the All-Rookie Team and AHL First All-Star Team.

With his stellar play in his only season in the AHL, Sterling made the Atlanta Thrashers roster out of training camp for the 2007–08 NHL season. He would score his first NHL goal against Johan Holmqvist on October 20, 2007. However, he was unable to maintain a high level of play on the struggling Thrashers and was sent back to Chicago shortly into the season. He would be called up several times during the year.

During the 2008–09 season, Sterling's goal production dropped by 21 from 38 the previous season to only 17, his lowest total since 2003–04 when he was with Colorado College. He rebounded in 2009–10 to score 34 goals for Chicago in 55 games, tying with Ryan Keller of the Binghamton Senators for 6th in the league, however he would not play in any NHL games for the first time since his rookie season with the Wolves.
On June 23, 2010, Sterling was traded by the Thrashers, along with Mike Vernace and a 7th round selection in 2010 NHL Entry Draft (Lee Moffie), to the San Jose Sharks for future considerations in order to help the Thrashers facilitate an earlier trade of Dustin Byfuglien from the Chicago Blackhawks. However, with his contract set to expire the Sharks chose not to re-sign Sterling and on July 3, 2010, Sterling was signed by the Pittsburgh Penguins to a 1-year contract, worth $500,000. Despite his new surroundings Sterling was unable to make the Penguins' roster coming out of training camp and was placed on waivers. After spending most of the year in the AHL Sterling was called up to the NHL on February 10, 2011, he made his Penguins debut later in the day in a game against the Los Angeles Kings. He scored his first goal as a Penguin in the game. After playing 7 games for the Penguins, registering 3 goals and 5 points he was re-assened to the Wilkes-Barre/Scranton Penguins. He finished the year with 27 goals and 53 points in 65 games for the Baby Penguins.

In the off season Sterling signed a one-year two-way contract with the St. Louis Blues. He began the year with St. Louis farm team the Peoria Rivermen. After 18 games Sterling was tied for the league lead in goals, 12, second in points with 22 and was called up by the Blues. He proceeded to make his Blues debut against his former team, Pittsburgh. In all he played four games with the Blues without registering a point. Sterling returned to Peoria and after playing 54 games and leading the team with 22 goals, he was traded (though his rights were retained by St. Louis) to the Portland Pirates for Patrick O'Sullivan. Sterling was the Rivermen's leading goal scorer at the time. He finished the year scoring 8 goals and 14 points with Portland as the Pirates failed to make the playoffs.

On the move again in the off-season Sterling returned to the site of his most AHL success signing an AHL contract with the Wolves. He was reunited with Darren Haydar, who played on a line with Sterling when he won the AHL goal scoring title.

For season 2013–14, Sterling signed a one-year contract with HV71 in the Swedish Hockey League. Sterling failed to establish his career offensive output totalling just 11 goals and 20 points in 43 games, before finishing the season on loan with SHL competitor Örebro HK.

On June 25, 2014, Sterling changed European leagues, in opting to join Austrian club, EC Red Bull Salzburg of the EBEL on a one-year contract.

Sterling dominated the action on the ice for Salzburg, helping them to a league championship in 2015.  He remained with Salzburg in the 2015–16 season, and again helped them to a league championship.

As a free agent in the following summer, Sterling opted to return to familiar grounds, signing a one-year AHL deal with the Chicago Wolves on July 22, 2016. After continuing through to the 2017–18 season with the Wolves, Sterling registered 25 points in 45 games before opting to end his professional career after 12 years.

International

Sterling has represented the United States internationally in three junior level competitions, the 2002 U-18 World Championships, and the 2003 and 2004 World Junior Championships. Sterling scored 9 goals and 12 points in eight games helping the U.S. Under-18 team win its first-ever gold medal. In 2004, he scored 3 goals as part of the gold medal-winning US squad.

Career statistics

Regular season and playoffs

International

Awards and honors

See also
List of select Jewish ice hockey players

References

External links

1984 births
Living people
American men's ice hockey left wingers
Atlanta Thrashers draft picks
Atlanta Thrashers players
Chicago Wolves players
Colorado College Tigers men's ice hockey players
HV71 players
Ice hockey people from Los Angeles
Jewish American sportspeople
Jewish ice hockey players
Örebro HK players
Peoria Rivermen (AHL) players
Pittsburgh Penguins players
Portland Pirates players
St. Louis Blues players
EC Red Bull Salzburg players
Sportspeople from Pasadena, California
Wilkes-Barre/Scranton Penguins players
American expatriate ice hockey players in Sweden
American expatriate sportspeople in Austria
AHCA Division I men's ice hockey All-Americans